The AAI underwater revolver is an amphibious firearm intended for naval use. The weapon was designed by Irwin R. Barr and John L. Critcher and uses a six-round cylinder inside a jacket covered by a float.

References

Cold War weapons of the United States
Revolvers of the United States
Underwater pistols
Flechette firearms